Palpita punctalis is a moth in the family Crambidae. It is found in Jamaica.

References

Palpita
Moths described in 1896
Moths of the Caribbean